KADT-LD, virtual and UHF digital channel 16, is a low-powered Daystar owned-and-operated television station licensed to Austin, Texas, United States. The station is owned by the Word of God Fellowship.

External links
Daystar Television Network Official site

Television stations in Texas
Television channels and stations established in 1992
Low-power television stations in the United States